Helen Worland (born 28 April 1950) is an Australian former professional tennis player.

Worland is originally from Canberra and was an ACT junior champion, later basing herself in Melbourne to train. She featured in the singles second round of the Australian Open three times and was a doubles quarter-finalist in 1969. Her career included a doubles main draw appearance at the 1970 Wimbledon Championships, where she also made the third qualifying round in singles. Before marrying Ian Worland in the early 1970s she competed as Helen Sheedy.

References

External links
 
 

1950 births
Living people
Australian female tennis players
Tennis people from the Australian Capital Territory
20th-century Australian women